The Bishop John T. Walker Distinguished Humanitarian Service Award (BWD or Bishop Walker Dinner) is an award presented annually by Africare to recognize those whose work has made a significant impact on raising the standard of living in Africa.  The award is named after John T. Walker, former Episcopal Bishop of Washington, D.C. and Africare board member. Each year, the Africare Bishop John T. Walker Memorial Dinner brings together more than 2,000 people — African heads of state, ministers of commerce and foreign affairs, leaders from the African Union and the United Nations, U.S. government leaders, diplomats, corporate executives, leaders of national organizations and private individuals — who share one focus: They care about Africa.

This is the largest annual event for Africa in the United States, with proceeds supporting the work of Africare. The Dinner is a top multicultural affair as well, embracing all races and a wide array of cultures and nationalities from around the world. The Dinner also honors outstanding humanitarians through the presentation of Africare's Bishop John T. Walker Distinguished Humanitarian Service Award.

Bishop John T. Walker Background
Bishop Walker came to Washington in 1966 as Canon of the Washington Cathedral, with special responsibility for its ministry to the community. He was elected Suffragan Bishop of Washington on May 1, 1971, and became the sixth Bishop of the Episcopal Diocese of Washington on July 3, 1977.

"I know some people get disheartened, and I know some people want to throw in the sponge and give up, but I can't do that. My feeling is too strong that it's God's will that we live together in harmony and peace. It's God's will that we grow beyond our racial animosties and that we must commit ourselves to continue that work. That's why I am here. I am not here for any other reason."

Past honorees

BWD history

BWD 2006
The Honoree: Bill Clinton
Main Theme: Orphans and Vulnerable Children "OVC"
Corporate Sponsor: United Parcel Service, Inc. (UPS)
Date of Event: Oct 18, 2006

At BWD 2006, held on October 18, Africare presented the Bishop John T. Walker Distinguished Humanitarian Service Award to former President Clinton for his outstanding contributions to peace, justice, and economic opportunity worldwide. The event also highlighted Africare's leading work meeting the needs of children in Africa who have lost one parent or both parents due to HIV/AIDS or through other tragic circumstances.

BWD 2005
The Honoree: Colin L. Powell
Main Theme: Africare 35th Anniversary
Corporate Sponsor: Shell Oil Company
Date of Event: Oct 13, 2005

BWD 2004
The Honoree: Senator 'Richard G. Lugar and Congressman 'Donald M. Payne
Main Theme: "Through the Eyes of a Child"
Corporate Sponsor: ChevronTexaco Corporation
Date of Event: Nov 5, 2004

BWD 2003
The Honoree: Bill Gates and Melinda Gates
Main Theme: Fighting HIV/AIDS
Corporate Sponsor: Louis W. Sullivan, M.D.
Date of Event: Oct 9, 2003

BWD 2002
The Honoree: Harry Belafonte
Main Theme: Combating HIV/AIDS and poverty
Corporate Sponsor: Archer Daniels Midland Company
Date of Event: Oct 24, 2002

BWD 2001
The Honoree: Louis W. Sullivan, M.D.
Main Theme: Victims of HIV/AIDS in Africa
Corporate Sponsor: James A. Harmon
Date of Event: Nov 6, 2001

BWD 2000
The Honoree: James David Wolfensohn
Main Theme: Combating AIDS in Africa
Corporate Sponsor: Eastman Kodak Company
Date of Event: Oct 19, 2000

BWD 1999
The Honoree: Graca Simbine Machel
Main Theme: The 10th Anniversary Bishop Walker Dinner
Corporate Sponsor: SBC Communications Inc.
Date of Event: Sep 27, 1999

BWD 1998
The Honoree: Andrew Young
Main Theme: Hunger and Poverty
Corporate Sponsor: Chevron Corporation
Date of Event: Oct 29, 1998

BWD 1997
The Honoree: Dorothy Irene Height
Main Theme: Women of Africa & Building a future
Corporate Sponsor: Discovery Communications, Inc.
Date of Event: Oct 23, 1997

BWD 1996
The Honoree: Jimmy Carter
Main Theme: Africare's 25th Anniversary and A tribute to Jimmy Carter
Corporate Sponsor: SmithKline Beecham
Date of Event: Oct 17, 1996

BWD 1995
The Honoree: The Reverend Leon Howard Sullivan
Main Theme: "A Celebration of Democracy in Africa"
Corporate Sponsor: Cookson Group, plc
Date of Event: Oct 19, 1995

BWD 1994
The Honoree: Nelson Mandela
Main Theme:
Corporate Sponsor: AT&T
Date of Event:

BWD 1993
The Honoree: Sargent Shriver
Main Theme:
Corporate Sponsor: Cookson Group, plc
Date of Event:

BWD 1992
The Honoree: Archbishop Desmond Tutu
Main Theme: "Celebrating the commitment to African development and cultural diversity"
Corporate Sponsor: Pharmaceutical Research and Manufacturers of America (PhrMA)
Date of Event: Oct 15, 1992

BWD 1991
No Honoree
Main Theme: "Celebrating the commitment to African development and cultural diversity"
Corporate Sponsor: IBM Corporation
Date of Event: Oct 17, 1991

BWD 1990
No Honoree
Main Theme: Honoring Bishop John T. Walker
Corporate Sponsor: The Coca-Cola Company
Date of Event: Oct 18, 2006

References

External links
Africare Bishop John T. Walker Memorial Dinner website

Humanitarian and service awards